Mathias Löder (born 29 December 1933) is a German racing cyclist. He rode in the 1958 Tour de France. and competed in cycling races in Germany and Belgium.

Löder raced for professional cycling team Torpedo - Fichtel & Sachs from 1957 to 1959, achieving top 4 finishes in three events:

 3rd - GP Fichtel & Sachs  - 1957
 3rd - GP Veith  - 1957
 4th - GP Veith  - 1959

References

External links
 

1933 births
Living people
German male cyclists
Place of birth missing (living people)
Cyclists from Cologne